Early Mormonism had a range of doctrines related to race with regards to black people of African descent. References to black people, their social condition during the 19th and 20th centuries, and their spiritual place in Western Christianity as well as in Mormon scripture were complicated.

From the beginning, black people have been members of Mormon congregations and Mormon congregations have always been interracial. When the Mormons migrated to Missouri, they encountered the pro-slavery sentiments of their neighbors. Joseph Smith upheld the laws regarding slaves and slaveholders, and affirmed the curse of Ham as placing his descendants into slavery, "to the shame and confusion of all who have cried out against the South." After the Mormons were expelled from Missouri, Smith took an increasingly strong anti-slavery position, and several black men were ordained to the LDS priesthood.

New York era (1820s and early 1830s)

The first reference to dark skin as a curse and mark from God in Latter Day Saint writings can be found in the Book of Mormon, published in 1830. It refers to a group of people called the Lamanites and states that when they rebelled against God they were cursed with "a skin of blackness".

The mark of blackness was placed upon the Lamanites so the Nephites "might not mix and believe in incorrect traditions which would prove their destruction". The Book of Mormon records the Lord as forbidding miscegenation between Lamanites and Nephites and saying they were to stay "separated from thee and thy seed [Nephites], from this time henceforth and forever, except they repent of their wickedness and turn to me that I may have mercy upon them".

However,  states: "[The Lord] inviteth them all to come unto him and partake of his goodness; and he denieth none that come, black and white, bond and free, male and female...and all are alike unto God, both Jew and Gentile."  Although the Lamanites are labelled as wicked, they actually became more righteous than the Nephites as time passed.

Throughout the Book of Mormon narrative, several groups of Lamanites did repent and lose the curse. The Anti-Nephi-Lehies or Ammonites "open[ed] a correspondence with them [Nephites], and the curse of God did no more follow them". There is no reference to their skin color being changed. Later, the Book of Mormon records that an additional group of Lamanites converted and that "their curse was taken from them, and their skin became white like unto the Nephites… and they were numbered among the Nephites, and were called Nephites".

The curse was also put on others who rebelled. One group of Nephites, called Amlicites "had come out in open rebellion against God; therefore it was expedient that the curse should fall upon them". The Amlicites then put a mark upon themselves. At this point, the author stops the narrative to say "I would that ye should see that they brought upon themselves the curse; and even so doth every man that is cursed bring upon himself his own condemnation."()  Eventually, the Lamanites "had become, the more part of them, a righteous people, insomuch that their righteousness did exceed that of the Nephites, because of their firmness and their steadiness in the faith."

The Book of Mormon did not countenance any form of curse-based discrimination. It stated that the Lord "denieth none that come unto him, black and white, bond and free, male and female; and he remembereth the heathen; and all are alike unto God, both Jew and Gentile".. In fact, prejudice against people of dark skin was condemned more than once, as in this example:
O my brethren, I fear that unless ye shall repent of your sins that their skins will be whiter than yours, when ye shall be brought with them before the throne of God. Wherefore, a commandment I give unto you, which is the word of God, that ye revile no more against them because of the darkness of their skins; neither shall ye revile against them because of their filthiness....

Missouri era (early 1830s to 1838)

In the summer of 1833 W. W. Phelps published an article in the church's newspaper, seeming to invite free black people into the state to become Mormons, and reflecting "in connection with the wonderful events of this age, much is doing towards abolishing slavery, and colonizing the blacks, in Africa." Outrage followed Phelps' comments, (Roberts [1930] 1965, p. 378.) and he was forced to reverse his position, which he claimed was "misunderstood", but this reversal did not end the controversy, and the Mormons were violently expelled from Jackson County, Missouri five months later in December 1833.

In 1835, the Church issued an official statement indicating that because the United States government allowed slavery, the Church would not "interfere with bond-servants, neither preach the gospel to, nor baptize them contrary to the will and wish of their masters, nor meddle with or influence them in the least to cause them to be dissatisfied with their situations in this life, thereby jeopardizing the lives of men." (D&C ).

On February 6, 1835, an assistant president of the church, W. W. Phelps, wrote a letter theorizing that the curse of Cain survived the deluge by passing through the wife of Ham, son of Noah, who according to Phelps was a descendant of Cain. (Messenger and Advocate 1:82) In addition, Phelps introduced the idea of a third curse upon Ham himself for "marrying a black wife". (Messenger and Advocate 1:82) This black wife, according to Phelps, was not just a descendant of Cain, but one of the pre-flood "people of Canaan", not directly related to the Biblical Canaanites after the flood.

In 1836, the rules established by the church for governing assemblies in the Kirtland Temple included attendees who were "bond or free, black or white." (History of the Church, Vol. 2, Ch. 26, p. 368)

Writing for the Messenger and Advocate newspaper on the subject of slavery, Joseph Smith states:

In April 1836, Smith said:

In 1836, Warren Parrish (Smith's secretary) wrote regarding the sentiments of the people of Kirtland:

The Church never denied membership based on race (although slaves had to have their master's permission to be baptized), and several black men were ordained to the priesthood during Joseph Smith's lifetime. The first known black Latter-day Saint was "Black Pete", who joined the Church in Kirtland, Ohio, and there is evidence that he held the priesthood. Other African Americans, including Elijah Abel in 1832, Joseph T. Ball in 1835 or 1836 (who also presided over the Boston Branch from 1844–1845), and Walker Lewis in 1843 (and probably his son, Enoch Lovejoy Lewis), were ordained to the priesthood during Smith's lifetime. William McCary was ordained in Nauvoo in 1846 by Apostle Orson Hyde.  Two of the descendants of Elijah Abel were also ordained Elders, and two other black men, Samuel Chambers and Edward Leggroan, were ordained Deacons.

Early black members in the Church were admitted to the temple in Kirtland, Ohio, where Elijah Abel received the ritual of washing and anointing (see Journal of Zebedee Coltrin ). Abel also participated in at least two baptisms for the dead in Nauvoo, Illinois, as did Elder Joseph T. Ball.

Nauvoo era prior to Smith's death (1838 to 1844)

In 1838, Joseph Smith had the following conversation:

In 1838, and throughout the 19th century the term "species" was borrowed and commonly used to imply that the black population was inferior. The biological use of the term species was first defined in 1686.

In 1838, Joseph Smith answered the following question while en route from Kirtland to Missouri, as follows: "Are the Mormons abolitionists?  No ... we do not believe in setting the Negroes free." (Smith 1977, p. 120)

By 1839 there were about a dozen black members in the Church. Nauvoo, Illinois was reported to have 22 black members, including free and slave, between 1839–1843 (Late Persecution of the Church of Latter-day Saints, 1840).

Beginning in 1842, Smith made known his increasingly strong anti-slavery position. In March 1842, he began studying some abolitionist literature, and stated, "it makes my blood boil within me to reflect upon the injustice, cruelty, and oppression of the rulers of the people. When will these things cease to be, and the Constitution and the laws again bear rule?" (History of the Church, 4:544).

On February 7, 1844, Joseph Smith wrote his views as a candidate for president of the United States.  The anti-slavery plank of his platform called for a gradual end to slavery by the year 1850 .  His plan called for the government to buy the freedom of slaves using money from the sale of public lands.

Notable Black members of the early LDS movement

Elijah Abel

Although Joseph Smith is not known to have made any statements regarding blacks and the priesthood, he was aware of the ordination of at least one black man to the office of elder. Elijah Abel was ordained on 3 March 1836 by Zebedee Coltrin. Six months later, he was ordained to the office of seventy and was called to serve in the Third Quorum of the Seventy.  Abel served his first mission for the church to New York and Upper Canada. In 1836, he moved from Kirtland to Nauvoo, Illinois, where he participated in the temple ordinance of baptism for the dead. In 1843, a traveling high council visited Cincinnati, where Abel lived, but refused to recognize Abel for the sake of public appearance and called him to his second mission to the "colored population" of Cincinnati.

Abel joined the other Latter-day Saints in Utah Territory in 1853. By then, Brigham Young had formalized church's policies against black people. However, no attempt was made to remove Abel's priesthood or drop him from the Third Quorum of the Seventy. He remained active in the Quorum until his death.

Green Flake

Born in 1829 Green Flake, the slave of James Madison Flake, a convert to the LDS Church, was baptized at the age of 16 on April 7, 1844 by John Brown. He accompanied the Flake family to Nauvoo, Illinois. Green remained a slave but was a member of the church throughout his life. From family diaries and the memory of a grandson, it is believed that it was Green who drove the carriage and team that brought President Brigham Young into the Salt Lake Valley. Brigham Young freed Flake in 1854.

Walker Lewis

Walker Lewis was another free black man who held the Mormon priesthood prior to the death of Joseph Smith. A prominent radical abolitionist, Episcopalian, and Most Worshipful Grand Master of Freemasonry from Lowell and Boston, Massachusetts, Lewis became a Latter Day Saint about 1842. In the summer of 1843, he was ordained an elder in the Melchizedek priesthood. His son, Enoch Lovejoy Lewis, also joined the Latter Day Saints about the same time, and Quaker poet John Greenleaf Whittier heard young Enoch preaching in Lowell just after the death of Joseph Smith in July or August 1844. It has been speculated  that Enoch led Young to instigate the ban against black men holding Mormon priesthood when Enoch L. Lewis married a white Mormon woman, Mary Matilda Webster, in Cambridge, Massachusetts on September 18, 1846 .  On December 3, 1847, Young told the Quorum of the Twelve at Winter Quarters that "if they [Enoch and Matilda] were far away from the Gentiles they wod. [would] all be killed – when they mingle seed it is death to all." (Quorum of the Twelve Minutes, December 3, 1847, pp. 6–7, LDS Archives.)

See also

Mormonism and slavery
1978 Revelation on Priesthood
Black Mormons
Black people in Mormon doctrine
Christian views on slavery
Genesis Group
Biddy Mason
Mormonism and Pacific Islanders

Notes

References

Further reading

External links
BlackLDS.org: A Web Site Dedicated to Black Members of The Church of Jesus Christ of Latter-day Saints
Authoritative Statements on the Status of Blacks, and Chronological Bibliography on the Negro Doctrine, from Signature Books at signaturebookslibrary.org
Essay on Latter-day Saint views on OD-2, by Julie M. Smith at timesandseasons.org
Current Strangite position statement, published by John Hajicek at strangite.org
LDS Racial History, by Christopher Nicholson at christopherrandallnicholson.webs.com

People of African descent
History of the Latter Day Saint movement
Mormonism and race